The Logatec Karst Field or Logatec Polje is a karst field near Logatec in southwestern Slovenia (the traditional region of Inner Carniola). Geographically, it corresponds to the floor of the Logatec Basin. Logaščica Creek, a losing stream, runs across the karst field and collects ambient water. The karst field often flooded in the past, and so land improvement was carried out. The northern part of the Logatec Karst Field is called the Empty Karst Field and the main road from Logatec to Vrhnika runs across it, passing through the linden-lined section known as the Napoleon Avenue. The southern part of the karst field is known as the Lower Logatec Karst Field, or metonymically as the Logatec Karst Field. The A1 Freeway from Ljubljana to Koper passes along the southeast edge of the karst field.

References

External links

Logatec Karst Field on Geopedia

Municipality of Logatec
Karst fields of Slovenia
Landforms of Inner Carniola